Quotidiano di Sicilia is an Italian daily regional newspaper for the island of Sicily.

History and profile
Quotidiano di Sicilia was founded in 1979 and is based in Catania. In 2008 the paper had a circulation of 21,500 copies.

Notes

External links
Official website 

1979 establishments in Italy
Italian-language newspapers
Quotidiano di Sicilia
Quotidiano di Sicilia
Quotidiano di Sicilia